The Morris Eight is a small family car produced by Morris Motors from 1935 to 1948. It was inspired by the sales popularity of the Ford Model Y, styling of which the Eight closely followed. The success of the car enabled Morris to regain its position as Britain's largest motor manufacturer.

Morris Eight series I

The  gearbox was a three-speed unit with synchromesh on the top two speeds and Lockheed hydraulic brakes were fitted. Coil ignition was used in a Lucas electrical system powered by a 6-volt battery and third brush dynamo.

The body, which was either a saloon or open tourer, was mounted on a separate channel section chassis with a  wheelbase. The tourer could reach  and return ; the saloons were a little slower.  The chrome-plated radiator shell and honeycomb grille were dummies disguising the real one hidden behind. In September 1934 the bare chassis was offered for £95.  For buyers of complete cars prices ranged from £118 for the basic two-seater to £142 for the four door saloon with "sunshine" roof and leather seats. Bumpers and indicators were £2 10 shillings (£2.50) extra.

Compared with the similarly priced, but much lighter and longer established Austin 7, the 1934/35 Morris Eight was well equipped.  The driver was provided with a full set of instruments including a speedometer with a built in odometer, oil pressure and fuel level gauges and an ammeter.  The more modern design of the Morris was reflected in the superior performance of its hydraulically operated 8-inch drum brakes.  The Morris also scored over its Ford rival by incorporating an electric windscreen wiper rather than the more old-fashioned vacuum powered equivalent, while its relatively wide 45 inch track aided directional stability on corners.

The series I designation was used from June 1935 in line with other Morris models, cars made before this are known as pre-series although the official Morris Motors designation was by the model year (35) even though they were introduced in October 1934. Of the 164,102 cars produced approximately 24,000 were tourers.

Variants

Morris Eight series II

In 1938 the car was updated with a slight restyle to match the other cars in the Morris range.  Changes included painted rather than plated radiator surrounds and disc (Easiclean) wheels replaced the previous "Magna" wire spoked ones. The engine and running gear were unchanged.

Morris Eight Series E

The Series E announced in October 1938 brought a major restyle with a "waterfall" dummy grille, headlights in the wings and the running boards had gone. There was now an "inbuilt luggage compartment with external access" with a space available of 'close on 5¼ cubic feet with the door closed'. There was also a parcels tray the full width of the dashboard. The "alligator" bonnet was now rear hinged making engine access poor. The engine was upgraded to the Morris USHM series, getting a new cylinder head, still side-valve however, the unit being very similar to those used in series 1 and 2 cars. The gearbox was now four-speed with syncromesh on second, third and top. The Lucas electrics remained at 6 volts, but now with automatic regulation of the dynamo in a two-brush system.

Production continued through the war for the military, essential civilian use and some export.  Post-war general production restarted in 1945 but there were no more tourers made in the UK. In Australia, however, a flourishing body-building industry continued to provide tourer versions on imported chassis/mechanicals.

The engine went on to be used, with very minor changes, in the series MM from 1948 till 1953 Morris Minor and was also adapted as an auxiliary power unit in Centurion, Conqueror and Chieftain tanks. Morris also used this engine as the basis of special Marine and Stationary power plants.

Postwar cars were sometimes fitted with vertical-lensed headlights, to get better lighting.

A very similarly styled Wolseley Eight was also prepared in the 1930s and offered after 1945.  An original 1939 prototype survives, having for many years been owned by Lord Nuffield.

Morris Series Z

A van version of the Series E, rated at 5 cwt capacity and designated as the Series Z, was produced from 1940 to 1953.  While having the external appearance similar to the Series E, mechanically the vans were more akin to the Series II, still having a three-speed gearbox. More than 51,000 examples were built.

A coupé utility variant of the Series Z was produced in Australia, utilising imported chassis and engines with locally built bodies.

References

External links

 The Morris Register of Victoria (Australia)
 The Morris Register of South Australia
 The Morris Register
 The Morris Eight Tourer Club of New Zealand
 An owner's website
 International Alliance of Morris Owners

Eight
Cars introduced in 1935
Rear-wheel-drive vehicles
Compact cars
Sedans
Convertibles
Vans
Pickup trucks